Dubrovsky (masculine), Dubrovskaya (feminine), or Dubrovskoye (neuter) may refer to:

Arts 
Dubrovsky (novel), an unfinished novel by Alexander Pushkin
Dubrovsky (opera), an 1895 opera
Dubrovsky (film), a 1936 Soviet drama film

People 
Alan Dubrovsky, a character from Shortland Street
Boris Dubrovsky (politician) (born 1958), Russian politician
Boris Dubrovskiy (born 1939), Soviet rower
Dmitry Dubrovsky (born 1974), Russian skier
Natalia Poklonskaya (née Dubrovskaya, 1980), Russian politician.
Peter P. Dubrovsky (1754–1816), Russian diplomat
Stanislav Dubrovsky (born 1974), Russian skier

Places 
Dubrovsky District, a district of Bryansk Oblast, Russia
Dubrovskoye Urban Settlement, several municipal urban settlements in Russia
Dubrovsky (rural locality), several rural localities in Russia

See also 
Dąbrowski (disambiguation)
Dubrovka (disambiguation)
Dubrov